Trachonas (or ) is a northern suburb of Nicosia, Cyprus. De facto, it is under the control of Northern Cyprus.

References

Communities in Nicosia District
Populated places in Lefkoşa District
Suburbs of Nicosia